Marabella North Secondary School is a government-run, public school in Trinidad located at the 1¼ mile Guaracara-Toruba mark. Since its inception, the school has taken part in many curricular activities and is a good schooling facility. The school is a seven-year institution where students graduate up to fifth form level and may opt to do Form 6 (Caribbean Advanced Proficiency Examinations, A levels) at their own request.

The school can boast of its seven scholarship winners, Marabella North Secondary has been exceptional in many co curricular activities such as Sanfest and RBC Young leaders.

References

External links 

Secondary schools in Trinidad and Tobago